The 2003 Denver Broncos season was the franchise's 34th season in the National Football League and the 44th overall.

After the departure of Brian Griese, who signed with his father's team, the Dolphins, the Broncos acquired Jake Plummer, who had been struggling in recent years with Arizona.

After two seasons of mediocrity, the Broncos rebounded with a 10–6 record. They also earned their first playoff berth since 2000. But Denver's season ended with a 41–10 blowout to the Indianapolis Colts in the Wild Card round. Following the season, Clinton Portis was traded to the Washington Redskins, and Shannon Sharpe and Ed McCaffrey both retired.

Offseason

NFL Draft

Draft notes

Staff

Roster

Regular season

Schedule

Game summaries

Week 1

Week 2

Week 3

Week 4

Week 5

Week 6

Week 7

Week 8

Week 9

Week 11

Week 12

Week 13

Week 14

Week 15

Week 16

Week 17

Standings

Postseason

Game summaries

AFC Wild Card Playoffs: at (#3) Indianapolis Colts

References

External links 
 Broncos on Pro Football Reference
 Broncos Schedule on jt-sw.com

Denver Broncos
Denver Broncos seasons
Denver Broncos